The Iraqi traditions and customs are unique to each ethnic group. The Arab women of Iraq typically wear a black and gold colored Hashimi dress.  Some non-Arab ethnic groups in Iraq have also adapted these traditional dresses into their cultures. The name of Hashimi dress is associated with the women of the Arabian tribe of Bani Hashim. The dress can also come in other colors such as green and gold or red and gold. In addition, the dress  is typically accompanied with jewelry such as gold earrings, necklaces, and headpiece.

Iraqi Designers

Hana Sadiq a famous Iraqi designer in the Middle East and Jordan designs traditional Arabic dresses.

References

Iraqi culture
Iraqi fashion
Dresses